The 2017 Turkish constitutional referendum 'No' campaign (Turkish: Hayır) refers to a collection of unsuccessful political campaigns led by political parties, organizations and media outlets in favour of a 'No' vote in the 2017 Turkish constitutional referendum. Were the campaign to have been successful, it would have resulted in Turkey remaining a parliamentary republic as opposed to an executive presidency, which it became as a result of the referendum, and would have constituted the first direct upset against the governing Justice and Development Party (AKP) since they took office in 2002.

'No' campaigners faced alleged government-backed coercion and suppression. On 1 March, the main opposition Republican People's Party (CHP) unveiled a 78-point report regarding irregularities and suppression of 'No' campaigners, with Deputy Leader Öztürk Yılmaz claiming that those who were campaigning for a 'No' vote faced fear and state coercion. CHP parliamentary group leader Engin Altay also criticized the government for using state funds to fund the 'Yes' campaign while repressing 'No' voters, claiming that their conduct did not allow them to talk of 'democracy'.

A 'No' vote was supported by the main opposition party, CHP, and the smaller opposition Peoples' Democratic Party (HDP). Over 40 smaller political parties were also in favour of a 'No' vote, as well as a significant number of Nationalist Movement Party (MHP) politicians and voters who opposed their leader President Recep Tayyip Erdogan's call for a 'Yes' vote. The main rival to the 'No' campaign, which did not have a centralized or united structure, was the 'Yes' campaign.

Supporters

Political parties
The following political parties supported a 'No' vote in 2017:

Organisations
The following organizations favoured a 'No' vote:

Republican People's Party (CHP) campaign

The Republican People's Party (CHP) held a pre-campaign rally in Adana on 3 December 2016, titled 'We will not partition Turkey'. The rally was also supported by Idealists, who traditionally support the MHP. The CHP parliamentary group voted against the proposals in Parliament but was unable to block their approval. On 15 February 2017, it was announced that the CHP wouldn't refer the voting process, which had been marred by unconstitutional open voting by AKP MPs, to the Constitutional Court, claiming that they believed that voters would reject the proposals at the ballot box.

On 6 February, the CHP unveiled a 10-article booklet detailing the reasons why they supported a 'No' vote, with the 10 key points being opposition to a 'one-man regime', a party state, the end of powers of Parliament, a government without scrutiny, a biased judiciary, en economic crisis, terrorism, the erosion of fundamental and universal values, to partitioning Turkey and an 'elected monarchy'. This followed on from a 21 December 2016 publication released by CHP Deputy Leader Bülent Tezcan, containing 35 questions and answers about the proposed presidential system.

On 28 February, the CHP unveiled their campaign, under the slogan ‘Geleceğim İçin Hayır’ ('No' for my future). It was stated that party logos would not be used during the campaign. The party also unveiled its first official campaign rally to be at Amasya, though one of the party's dissident MPs Muharrem İnce held a rally at Alaplı, Zonguldak Province on 8 March. Also on 8 March International Women's Day, the CHP Women's Wing in İzmir held an event where participants spelled out the word 'No' with their bodies, with the scene captured by helicopter. The event was also attended by party leader Kemal Kılıçdaroğlu's wife Selvi and Deputy Leader Selin Sayek Böke.

Many CHP MPs began visiting different areas of Turkey and Turkish expats abroad in order to gather support for a 'No' vote soon after the referendum date was announced. The party's former leader Deniz Baykal attended an event in France while İstanbul Member of Parliament Sezgin Tanrıkulu and parliamentary group leader Özgür Özel led a group of MPs to Diyarbakır where the party has no representation.

At the start of the campaign, party leader Kemal Kılıçdaroğlu reportedly asked the party's officials to conduct the 'No' campaign on a purely positive basis, refraining from using a negative or alienating discourse. It was also reported that the CHP were getting ready to make a campaign film similar to the 'No' campaign for the Chilean national plebiscite of 1988, which resulted in a victory for the 'No' side and an eventual end to the regime of Augusto Pinochet.

Peoples' Democratic Party (HDP) campaign

References

External links 
 "The CHP’s arguments against constitutional changes in Turkey". TRT World.
 "Why the HDP doesn't support the proposed amendments in Turkey" . TRT World.

2017 Turkish constitutional referendum
Election campaigns in Turkey